Podsmreka Castle is a 16th-century mansion located in the settlement of Podsmreka pri Višnji Gori, in the Municipality of Ivančna Gorica, southeastern Slovenia. The manor's name is a compound of the Slovene words pod and smreka, meaning "beneath [the] spruce." The municipality of Ivančna Gorica is trying to have the mansion restored as a motel.

History
Built by the noble Galli family in the late 16th century, the mansion has been rebuilt several times by later owners. In the late 19th century, it was bought by Ljubljana merchant Fortuna; between the world wars, it was property of the Viennese nobleman Klarwill, who maintained a library and art collection in it. 

After World War II, the mansion was nationalized and came to house the pottery collection of the Slovene Ethnographic Museum. In the mid-1970s, a sand pit was opened near the manor; the museum closed soon thereafter. Since then, it has slowly deteriorated while serving as an apartment housing.

External links

Manors in Slovenia